Football at the 2021 Summer Deaflympics  will held in Caxias Do Sul, Brazil from 30 April to 15 May 2022.

Medalists

Men's tournament

Group stage

Pool A

Matches
30 April 2022
  1–1 
  2–1 

2 May 2022
  1–0 
  0–5 

4 May 2022
  2–3 
  2–3 

6 May 2022
  0–9 
  1–0 

8 May 2022
  1–2 
  0–10 

Standings

Pool B

Matches
30 April 2022
  2–3 
  0–2 

2 May 2022
  0–4 
  1–4 

4 May 2022
  2–4 
  0–1 

6 May 2022
  1–0 
  4–1 

8 May 2022
  4–0 
  6–0 

 Standings

Pool C

Matches
30 April 2022
  4–1 
  2–0 

2 May 2022
  0–5 
  0–1 

4 May 2022
  0–5 
  0–2 

6 May 2022
  4–0 
  4–3 

8 May 2022
  5–2 
  2–1 

Standings

Pool D
Matches
30 April 2022
  3–0 
  0–6 

2 May 2022
  2–2 
  3–2 

4 May 2022
  1–4 
  4–1 

6 May 2022
  4–0 
  0–3 

8 May 2022
  1–2 
  0–1 

Standings

Knockout stage

Elimination
<onlyinclude>

Classification

Women's tournament

Group stage

Pool A

Final results

References

External links
 Deaflympics 2021

2022 in association football
International association football competitions hosted by Brazil
2021 Summer Deaflympics
2022 in Brazilian football